St. Paul's Convent School (SPCS) is a private Catholic  girls' school in Hong Kong founded by the Sisters of St. Paul de Chartres from France in 1854. The school was formerly called French Convent School and was renamed St. Paul's Convent School in 1955. It ranks third among all secondary schools in Hong Kong (2022).

The school has four sections: nursery N1-N4, kindergarten K1-K3, primary P1-P6 and secondary F1-F6.

The school's motto is Omnia omnibus, Latin for "Being all things to all people" (1 Cor 9:22).

The summer uniform of St. Paul's Convent School is a white back-buttoned short-sleeved blouse, a checkered skirt with black and white shoes (commonly known as "panda shoes"), a bow tie for kindergarten and elementary school students, a normal tie for middle school students. The winter uniform is a white long-sleeved shirt and navy blue skirt for middle school students.

Facilities
School facilities include:

 The Classroom of the Future
 3D Printing Studio
 Multi-media Self-learning Centre
 Computer-aided Learning Laboratory
 Information Technology Learning Centre
 Creative Media Laboratory
 Campus TV Station
 6 Science Laboratories
 Study Room and Library
 KLA Special Rooms
 Dance Studio
 Art Room
 Music Room 
 Organic Roof Garden
 Hydroponic Greenhouse
 Indoor Heated Swimming Pool

The School has also recently built a 'green building', known as the 'Smart Oasis', that integrates technology with nature. Recently, it also established a Lingzhi Farm as well as installed 85" interactive Promethean whiteboards for all classrooms and some special rooms.

The School also has installed some accessibility features for students who may be disabled or have special needs, such as wheelchair ramps, elevators (which are mostly used by the teachers) and accessible toilets.

Houses
Students in St. Paul's Convent School are separated into 6 houses. In annual events like Sports Day and Swimming Gala, the six houses compete in cheering competitions and aim at achieving the Overall House Champion.

MORRIS (Purple) 
Named after Margaret Morris (1891-1980),  a British dancer, choreographer, artist and teacher .

CAVELL (Blue) 
Named after Edith Louisa Cavell (1865–1915), a British nurse who was executed as a spy during World War I.KENNY (Green) 
Named after Elizabeth Kenny (1886–1952), the Australian nurse known for her technique of treating poliomyelitis, or infantile paralysis.CURIE (Yellow) 
Named after the scientist Marie Skłodowska Curie (1867–1934).KELLER (Red) 
Named after Helen Adams Keller (1880–1968), an American author and educator of the blind.MASON (Orange)''' 
Named after Charlotte Mason (1842-1923), an educationalist whose philosophy influenced modern primary schools.

Extracurricular activities
Students participate in various extracurricular activities and competitions. For example, the annual Inter-class English and Chinese debate competitions, dance competition and the annual Music Talent Quest (MTQ). There are also 55 extracurricular clubs, societies, voluntary service units and interest groups for students to join and explore their interests and talents. There are also exchange programs with schools of foreign countries, such as trips to Beijing, America, Canada, Sichuan, Spain and France.

The SPCS has various sports teams including athletic team, swimming team, badminton team, dragon dance team and netball team.

The SPCS dance club consists of Western dance team, Modern dance team and Chinese dance team.

The two SPCS dance teams perform in various occasions, such as the opening of 2008 Beijing Olympics equestrian competitions that was held in Hong Kong. Each team has about 20 dancers which were selected through auditions held around September by committee members. Dancers receive training once or twice a week, each ranging from 1–2 hours. Extra trainings are often organized before competitions.

Notable alumni 

 Yeung Sau-king, Olympic swimmer
 Lydia Dunn, Baroness Dunn, former life peer in the House of Lords of the UK Parliament
 Pansy Ho, businesswoman
 Margaret Ng, politician, barrister, writer
 Edwina Lau, head of the National Security Department of the Hong Kong Police Force
 Christine Loh, former member of the Legislative Council of Hong Kong, former Undersecretary for the Environment HKSAR
 Ann Hui, film director, producer, screenwriter and actress
 Emily Ying Yang Chan, humanitarian doctor
 Shirley Kwan, singer
 Anne Heung, actress
 Stephanie Che, actress
 Ellen Joyce Loo, singer
 Nicola Cheung, former actress

Sister Schools
 St. Paul's Secondary School
 St. Paul's School (Lam Tin)

References

External links

Official site
Alumni Association

Girls' schools in Hong Kong
Secondary schools in Hong Kong
Wan Chai District